The 2013 Mountain West Conference men's basketball tournament was a tournament played at the Thomas & Mack Center in Las Vegas, Nevada on March 12–15, 2013.  With TCU departing for the Big 12, and Fresno State and Nevada joining the MWC, the MWC will have a 9 team tournament for 2013. As the tournament champion, New Mexico received the Mountain West Conference's automatic bid to the 2013 NCAA Tournament.

Seeds
Teams are seeded by conference record, with a ties broken by record between the tied teams followed by record against the regular–season champion, if necessary.

Schedule

Bracket

References

Mountain West Conference men's basketball tournament
Tournament
Mountain West Conference men's basketball tournament
Mountain West Conference men's basketball tournament